Sébastien Meunier is a French fashion designer. He was the creative director of Ann Demeulemeester's label from 2010 until 2020.

Biography 

Sébastien Meunier was born in Versailles in 1974.

He graduated from ESMOD, the Paris-based fashion school, in 1997. The collection, that drew inspiration from fetichism and body transformations, was awarded with the first fashion prize from the jury presided by Martine Sitbon, Hussein Chalayan and Jean Colonna - the later offering him immediately his first position. Sébastien Meunier assisted Jean Colonna until he decided to launch his own menswear label in 1999.

Through his eponymous brand, highly autobiographical, Sébastien Meunier would explore for 7 years new fields of masculinity, questioning identities and his own individuality and would eventually become a precursor of the hyper-sexualization of the male body in fashion.

As early as 2000, Sébastien Meunier's work caught the attention of Martin Margiela, inaugurating a decade-long collaboration with the revered designer, first as head of design for MM6, then as creative director for all men's lines of Maison Margiela.

Ann Demeulemeester asked him to join her in Antwerp in 2010 to look after her menswear collections, cementing Sébastien Meunier's affinity with Belgian fashion. Following her decision to retire from the fashion industry in 2013, the Belgian designer chose him as her successor at the helm of the brand she founded in 1985. While staying true to the DNA of the Nineties romantic designer, Sébastien Meunier made the brand evolve toward a more inclusive, gender(s) free(d) aesthetic, reaching a fresh audience. In July 2020, Sébastien Meunier left the company shortly before the relocation of the brand in Italy.

In parallel to his designer's work, Sébastien Meunier is particularly interested in the arts of performance, having staged or participated to several performances throughout his career, including EAT (°2008) which he co-created with the late choreographer Alain Buffard and is now part of the collection of the Centre Pompidou.

References

 "Sébastien Meunier, l’Anvers d’un styliste français". Télérama. Published on October 6, 2016.
 "The fearless Parisian designer reinventing Ann Demeulemeester". Büro 24/7. Published on February 21, 2016.
 "Sébastien Meunier, haute fidélité". Le Monde. Published on May 8, 2015.
 "Martin Margiela Influences Young Designers". WWD. Published on April 13, 2015.
 "Qui est Sébastien Meunier, nouveau directeur artistique d'Ann Demeulemeester?". L'Express Styles. Published on October 27, 2014.
 "Interview post-show avec Sébastien Meunier au défilé Ann Demeulemeester". Vogue.fr. Published on September 26, 2014.
 "L'après Ann Demeulemeester par Sébastien Meunier". Le Vif Weekend. Published on September 12, 2014.
 "MAN OH MAN: Ann Demeulemeester". WWD. Published on November 5, 2010.

External links 

 Ann Demeulemeester Official Site
 Ann Demeulemeester coverage on Vogue Runway
 Villa Noailles Official Site

1974 births
Living people
French fashion designers
People from Versailles
High fashion brands